Laenly Phoutthavong (born 4 June 1996 in Vientiane) is a Laotian athlete competing in the long and triple jump. She competed at the 2012 Summer Olympics in the 100 metres event.

Competition record

References

External links
 

1996 births
Living people
People from Vientiane
Laotian female sprinters
Olympic athletes of Laos
Athletes (track and field) at the 2012 Summer Olympics
Athletes (track and field) at the 2016 Summer Olympics
Athletes (track and field) at the 2014 Asian Games
Asian Games competitors for Laos
Olympic female sprinters